Group B of the Copa América Centenario consisted of Brazil, Ecuador, Haiti, and Peru. Matches began 4 June and ended on 12 June 2016. All times are EDT (UTC−4).

Peru and Ecuador advanced to the quarter-finals.

Teams

Notes

Standings

In the quarter-finals:
The winner of Group B, Peru, advanced to play the runner-up of Group A, Colombia.
The runner-up of Group B, Ecuador, advanced to play the winner of Group A, United States.

Matches

Haiti vs Peru
The two teams had met in four previous encounters, the last being a friendly in 2003 won by Peru 3–0. Both teams faced each other in an official tournament for the second time in history, after a 1–1 draw in a 2000 CONCACAF Gold Cup group stage match. This match marked Haiti's debut in Copa América, making them the second Caribbean team to appear at the tournament, after Jamaica in 2015.

Brazil vs Ecuador
The two teams had met in twenty-nine previous encounters, the last being a friendly held at the MetLife Stadium in East Rutherford, New Jersey in 2014, won by Brazil with a lone goal by Willian. Their last Copa América encounter was a 2011 group stage match, won by Brazil 4–2, with braces scored by Alexandre Pato, Neymar, and Felipe Caicedo.

Brazil vs Haiti
The two teams had met in only two previous occasions, both friendlies, the last held at the Stade Sylvio Cator in Port-au-Prince in 2004, which Brazil won 6–0.

Ecuador vs Peru
The two teams had met in forty-seven previous occasions, the last being a 2014 FIFA World Cup qualifying match held in Lima in 2013, which Peru won with a lone goal by Claudio Pizarro. In Copa América, their last meeting was in a 1995 group stage match, won by Ecuador 2–1.

Ecuador vs Haiti
The two teams had met in four previous encounters, the last being a friendly in 2008, which Ecuador won 3–1. This was the second match between both teams in an official tournament, as they already faced each other in a 2002 CONCACAF Gold Cup group stage match, won by Haiti 2–0.

Brazil vs Peru
The two teams had met in forty-one previous encounters, the last being a 2018 FIFA World Cup qualifying match held at the Itaipava Arena Fonte Nova in Salvador in 2015, which Brazil won 3–0. Earlier that year, they had their latest Copa América encounter, a group stage match, also won by Brazil 2–1.

References

External links
CONCACAF standings

Group B
2016 in Brazilian football
2016 in Ecuadorian football